El Hub Keda (translit.Al Hubb Kida or Al-Houbb kidah aliases: That’s What Love Is or This is Love French: C'est ça l'amour) is a 1961 Egyptian romance film starring Salah Zulfikar and Sabah. It is written by Badi' Khayri and directed by Mahmoud Zulfikar.

Plot 
Hamdi, is a mechanical engineer owning a car repair shop, he loves his cousin Nadia without her even realizing it. Nadia, is a newly divorced wealthy young woman, she loves the attractive young Hazem, who is chasing her aiming to marry her fir her wealth. They secretly meet and she claims to her family that she is meeting her cousin Hamdi instead, who From time to time she passes by Hamdi, At the same time, his friend Ezzat loves Hazem's Salwa. Nadia goes to Hazem's house to visit his mother, Hamdi watches her and confronts her. Hazem tries to rape her and Hamdi saves her. Nadia's parents approves the marriage proposal of Ihsan, a wealthy man who she cannot stand, and she also does not want to fail in any upcoming marriage. She agrees with Hamdi to fame their marriage to escape from Ihsan marriage proposal. Afterwards, they go through situations that push them to get closer, and at the end, the fictitious marriage turns into a real one.

Crew 

 Writer: Badi' Khayri
 Screenwriter: Mohamed Abu Youssef
 Director: Mahmoud Zulfikar
 Produced by: Union Films (Abbas Helmi)
 Distribution: Al Sharq Film Distribution Company
 Soundtrack: Andre Ryder
 Cinematographer: Wadid Serry
 Editor: Fekry Rostom

Cast 

 Salah Zulfikar as Hamdi
 Sabah as Nadia
 Laila Taher as Salwa
 Abdul Moneim Ibrahim as Ezzat Gadallah
 Youssef Fakhr Eddine as Hazem
 Mimi Chakib as Nadia's mother
 Adly Kasseb as Ramadan, Nadia's father
 Mohamed El-Deeb as Ehsan
 Bob Azzam as Singer
 Azhar Sharif
 Fatima El-Gamal
 Ekram
 Yasmine
 Mimi Gamal as Hazem's girlfriend
 Hussein Ismail as Sheikh Ali
 Mukhtar Sayed
 Awatef Yousry
 Gamil Ezz El Din
 Essam Abdo

Songs 

 Vocal: Sabah
 “Muhtar Ya Qalbi”, written by Fathi Qora, composed by Farid al-Atrash
 "Ew'a", written by Muhammad Halawa, composed by Muhammad Al-Mougui

 Vocal: Bob Azzam
 ”Ya Mustafa”, written by: Saeed El Masry, Composed by Mohamed Fawzi

See also 
 Egyptian cinema
 Salah Zulfikar filmography
 List of Egyptian films of 1961
 List of Egyptian films of the 1960s

References

External links 
 El Hub Keda on elCinema
 

1961 films
Films directed by Mahmoud Zulfikar
1960s Arabic-language films
Egyptian romantic drama films
Egyptian black-and-white films